Marco del Buono, also Marco del Buono Giamberti, (1402–1489) was an Italian painter and woodworker.

Life
Marco del Buono was documented in Florence as a member of the "Arte dei Medici e Speziali" Physicians' and Apothecaries’ Guild for painters in 1426. From dated works we know by 1446 he was in partnership with Apollonio di Giovanni di Tommaso in the production of cassones (marriage chests), such as the Cassone with a Tournament Scene attributed to Apollonio's workshop. A cassone painted with The Conquest of Trebizond from Palazzo Strozzi, with Strozzi armorial bearings, one of the minority of cassone panels remaining integral to its cassone, is conserved at the Metropolitan Museum of Art.

References

External links
Italian Paintings: Florentine School, a collection catalog containing information about del Buono and his works (see pages: 100–105).

1402 births
1489 deaths
15th-century Italian painters
Italian male painters
Italian woodworkers
Painters from Florence